Rick E. Lawrence (born 1955/1956) is an American lawyer and judge from Maine who has served as a justice of the Maine Supreme Judicial Court since 2022.

Education 

Lawrence received his Bachelor of Arts from Yale University in 1977 and his Juris Doctor from Harvard Law School in 1986.

Legal career 
Prior to his judicial service, Lawrence was an attorney and vice president and managing counsel at Unum and as an associate at Pierce Atwood.

Judicial career 

Lawrence served as a state district judge from April 5, 2000 to May 4, 2022. He was first nominated by governor Angus King and then renominated by governor John Baldacci, governor Paul LePage and Governor Mills. He has served as deputy chief judge since April 2020.

Maine Supreme Judicial Court 

On March 7, 2022, governor Janet Mills nominated Lawrence to be an associate justice of the Maine Supreme Judicial Court to the seat to be vacated by justice Ellen Gorman who announced her intent to retire in January 2021. On April 8, 2022, his nomination was unanimously reported out of the judiciary committee. On April 12, 2022, his nomination was unanimously confirmed by the Maine Senate. Lawrence was sworn into office on May 4, 2022. He is the first African American justice on the high court.

References

External links 

1950s births
Living people
20th-century American lawyers
20th-century American judges
21st-century American judges
African-American judges
African-American lawyers
Harvard Law School alumni
Justices of the Maine Supreme Judicial Court
Lawyers from Portland, Maine
Maine lawyers
Maine state court judges
Yale University alumni